Lincoln Memorial Cemetery may refer to:

 Lincoln Memorial Park, Miami, Florida
 Lincoln Memorial Cemetery (Suitland, Maryland)